This is a List of National Historic Landmarks in Ohio and other landmarks of equivalent landmark status in the state. The United States' National Historic Landmark (NHL) program is operated under the auspices of the National Park Service, and recognizes structures, districts, objects, and similar resources according to a list of criteria of national significance. There are 76 NHLs in Ohio and four additional National Park Service-administered areas of primarily historic importance.

Current National Historic Landmarks in Ohio
Ohio's National Historic Landmarks are distributed across 37 of the 88 counties in the state. With fourteen NHLs, Hamilton County has more than any other county.

|}

Historic areas of the National Park System in Ohio
National Historic Sites, National Historic Parks, National Memorials, and certain other areas listed in the National Park system are historic landmarks of national importance that are highly protected already, sometimes before the inauguration of the NHL program in 1960, and are then often not also named NHLs per se. There are seven of these in Ohio. The National Park Service lists these seven together with the NHLs in the state.

The James A. Garfield National Historic Site, the William Howard Taft National Historic Site, and the Charles Young Buffalo Soldiers National Monument are also designated as NHLs and are listed above. The remaining four are as follows.

Former NHLs in Ohio

See also
 List of National Historic Landmarks by state
 National Register of Historic Places listings in Ohio

References

External links

 .
 National Historic Landmarks program, at National Park Service
 South Carolina Department of Archives and History: The National Register of Historic Places - Search Records by County
 

Ohio
 
National Historic Landmarks in Ohio
National Historic Landmarks